Andy Andrews (born May 22, 1959) is an American author whose work has appeared on The New York Times bestseller lists in the categories of  Hardcover Fiction, Hardcover Nonfiction, Business, and Advice, How-To & Miscellaneous. He is best known for the international bestselling book The Traveler's Gift.  ABC’s Good Morning America named it "one of the five books you should read in your lifetime.” He has written over 26 books and sold more than 20 million copies around the world. His books have been translated into over 40 languages. Andrews regularly speaks for corporations, organizations, athletic teams, and the U.S. military.

Andrews releases a weekly podcast, “The Professional Noticer”.  He is the creator of WisdomHarbour.com and produces a live-streaming program, The Blue Plate Special, twice a week.

Andrews has appeared on The Fox News Channel, Good Morning America, MSNBC, TBN, GBTV and CNBC.

Life and career 
Andrews was born Birmingham, Alabama and raised in Dothan, Alabama. His father was a minister of music and his mother played piano, organ, and directed the church's children’s choir programs. When Andrews was 19, he lost his mother (41) to cancer and his father (44) in an automobile accident within the span of a few months. After the death of his parents, Andrews spent over a year homeless on the coast of Alabama. It was during this time that he read more than 200 biographies and came up with "The Seven Decisions" that eventually shaped the manuscript of his 2002 novel The Traveler’s Gift.

Before beginning to write, Andrews worked as a stand-up comedian and toured extensively with Joan Rivers, Kenny Rogers, Randy Travis, Garth Brooks, Cher, and Chaka Khan.

He currently is the CEO of Creating Measurable Results, a corporate and sports consulting firm. His business book, The Bottom of the Pool—Thinking Beyond Your Boundaries To Achieve Extraordinary Results, released in 2019, was named by Forbes as one of the 7 Books Every Entrepreneur Must Read.

Andrews is an alumnus of Auburn University.

Books
In 2009, Andrews released his second New York Times bestseller, The Noticer. He released his first children’s book, The Boy Who Changed the World, in 2010. An adult version of the children’s story, titled The Butterfly Effect, was also released as a gift book.  A novel titled The Traveler’s Summit was released in April 2011. It features the same main character as The Traveler’s Gift, David Ponder. 

Andrews is also known for his major work How Do You Kill 11 Million People? - Why the Truth Matters More Than You Think.  His newest book, Just Jones, the third in The Noticer series, has been released nationwide.

Book list

 Storms of Perfection 1 (1992)
 Storms of Perfection 2 (1994)
 Storms of Perfection 3 (1996)
 Storms of Perfection 4 (1997)
 Go For It: Letters from American Heroes (2002)
 Go For It: Letters from Sports Heroes (2002)
 Go For It: Letters from Inspirational Heroes (2002)
 Go For It: Letters From Celebrity Heroes (2002)
 The Traveler's Gift (2002)
 The Traveler’s Gift Journal (2004)
 The Young Traveler’s Gift (2004)
 The Lost Choice (2004)
 Socks for Christmas (2005)
 Island of Saints (2005)
 Mastering the Seven Decisions (2008)
 The Noticer (2009)
 Return to Sawyerton Springs (2009)
 The Heart Mender (2010)
 The Butterfly Effect (2010)
 The Boy Who Changed the World (2010)
 The Final Summit (2011)
 How Do You Kill 11 Million People? (2012)
 The Noticer Returns (2013)
 The Traveler’s Summit 
 The Little Things
 The Bottom of the Pool
 Just Jones

See also
List of Auburn University people
 Business fable

References

External links 
 Official Andy Andrews website

1959 births
Living people
People from Dothan, Alabama
Auburn University alumni
American motivational writers
American motivational speakers
American self-help writers
Life coaches
People from Orange Beach, Alabama